This list is of the Historic Sites of Japan located within the Prefecture of Shiga.

National Historic Sites
As of 1 January 2021, fifty Sites have been designated as being of national significance (including two *Special Historic Sites); Genbao Castle Site spans the prefectural borders with Fukui.

|}

Prefectural Historic Sites
As of 1 May 2020, forty-four Sites have been designated as being of prefectural importance.

Municipal Historic Sites
As of 1 May 2020, a further eighty-seven Sites have been designated as being of municipal importance.

See also

 Cultural Properties of Japan
 Ōmi Province
 List of Places of Scenic Beauty of Japan (Shiga)
 List of Cultural Properties of Japan - historical materials (Shiga)

References

External links
  Cultural Properties in Shiga Prefecture

Shiga Prefecture
 Mie